Garrison Mathews (born October 24, 1996) is an American professional basketball player for the Atlanta Hawks of the National Basketball Association (NBA). Nicknamed “Gary Bird”, he played college basketball for the Lipscomb Bisons and was named the ASUN Conference Player of the Year for 2019.

College career

Mathews was a dual-sport athlete at Franklin High School in Franklin, Tennessee, playing both basketball and football. At Lipscomb, Mathews dedicated himself solely to basketball for the first time. He became one of the top players in program history, setting the school's Division I-era records in single-game scoring, career scoring, and three-pointers made.

As a junior, Mathews led the Bisons to their first NCAA tournament. As a senior, he was named Atlantic Sun Player of the Year and first-team All-Atlantic Sun. He also led Lipscomb to a runner-up finish at the 2019 NIT. Mathews scored 44 and 34 points in the tournament's quarterfinals and semifinals, respectively, to help the Bisons reach the championship game, where they were defeated by Texas. Mathews averaged 20.8 points per game as a senior and scored 2,478 career points in college.

Professional career

Washington Wizards (2019–2021)
After going undrafted in the 2019 NBA draft, Mathews signed a two-way contract with the Washington Wizards of the National Basketball Association (NBA). Under the terms of the deal he divided his time between the Wizards and the NBA G League affiliate, the Capital City Go-Go. On October 23, 2019, Mathews made his debut in NBA, coming off from bench in a 100–108 loss to the Dallas Mavericks with an assist. On December 30, Mathews scored a career-high 28 points with four rebounds in a 123–105 win over the Miami Heat.

Houston Rockets (2021–2023)
On September 28, 2021, Mathews signed with the Boston Celtics, but was waived at the end of training camp. On October 18, he was claimed off waivers by the Houston Rockets, who later turned his deal into a two-way contract with the Rio Grande Valley Vipers. On December 18, the Rockets announced they had converted Mathews’ two-way deal to a standard contract.

Atlanta Hawks (2023–present)
On February 9, 2023, Mathews and Bruno Fernando were traded to the Atlanta Hawks in exchange for Justin Holiday, Frank Kaminsky and 2 future second-round draft picks.

Career statistics

NBA

Regular season

|-
| style="text-align:left;"|
| style="text-align:left;"|Washington
| 18 || 0 || 12.6 || .429 || .413 || .912 || 1.3 || .6 || .4 || .1 || 5.4
|-
| style="text-align:left;"|
| style="text-align:left;"|Washington
| 64 || 24 || 16.2 || .409 || .384 || .884 || 1.4|| .4 || .5 || .1 || 5.5
|-
| style="text-align:left;"|
| style="text-align:left;"|Houston
| 65 || 33 || 26.3 || .399 || .360 || .794 || 2.9|| 1.0 || .8 || .3 || 10.0
|-
| style="text-align:left;"|
| style="text-align:left;"|Houston
| 45 || 0 || 13.4 || .353 || .342 || .911 || 1.4 || .5 || .5 || .1 || 4.8
|- class="sortbottom"
| style="text-align:center;" colspan="2"|Career
| 192 || 57 || 18.6 || .395 || .366 || .845 || 1.9 || .6 || .6 || .2 || 6.9

Playoffs

|-
| style="text-align:left;"| 2021
| style="text-align:left;"| Washington
| 3 || 0 || 5.7 || .000 || .000 || .800 || .7 || .0 || .0 || .0 || 1.3
|- class="sortbottom"
| style="text-align:center;" colspan="2"|Career
| 3 || 0 || 5.7 || .000 || .000 || .800 || .7 || .0 || .0 || .0 || 1.3

College

|-
| style="text-align:left;"| 2015–16
| style="text-align:left;"| Lipscomb
| 33 || 12 || 20.8 || .403 || .349 || .732|| 3.4 || 1.5 || .8 || .2 || 10.9
|-
| style="text-align:left;"| 2016–17
| style="text-align:left;"| Lipscomb
| 32 || 32 || 31.3 || .458 || .352 || .726 || 5.6 || 2.3 || .8 || .2 || 20.4
|-
| style="text-align:left;"| 2017–18
| style="text-align:left;"| Lipscomb
| 33 || 32 || 30.4 || .465 || .381 || .799 || 5.5 || 1.8 || 1.0 || .3 || 21.7
|-
| style="text-align:left;"| 2018–19
| style="text=align:left;"| Lipscomb
| 36 || 36 || 30.1 || .443 || .403 || .860 || 5.5 || 1.9 || .8 || .3 || 20.8
|- class:"sortbottom"
| style:"text-align:center;" colspan="2"|Career
| 134 || 112 || 28.2 || .446 || .374 || .789 || 5.0 || 1.9 || .9 || .2 || 18.5

References

External links

Lipscomb Bisons bio
College statistics from Sports-Reference.com

1996 births
Living people
American men's basketball players
Basketball players from Tennessee
Capital City Go-Go players
Houston Rockets players
Lipscomb Bisons men's basketball players
People from Franklin, Tennessee
Rio Grande Valley Vipers players
Shooting guards
Undrafted National Basketball Association players
Washington Wizards players